Setaepoma is a genus of minute salt marsh snails with an operculum, terrestrial gastropod mollusks in the subfamily Omphalotropidinae  of the family Assimineidae.

Species
 Setaepoma hedigeri (I. Rensch & B. Rensch, 1935)
 Setaepoma hoodi Clench, 1965
 Setaepoma mayri Clench, 1958

References

 Clench, W. J. (1955). Setaepoma, a new genus in the Synceridae from the Solomon Islands. Nautilus. 68, 134

External links
 

Assimineidae